America's Civil War is a full-color history magazine published bi-monthly which covered the American Civil War. It was established in 1987 by editor Roy Morris Jr. It carries articles about the battles, campaigns, leaders, and common soldiers of the Civil War. It contains thought-provoking essays on the way the war is remembered today as well as lengthy first-hand accounts of the war. In 2006 Stephen Petranek was named the editor-in-chief of the magazine.

America's Civil War, along with its sister publication Civil War Times, is published in Leesburg, Virginia, by the Weider History Group. The company bought the magazine from Primedia in 2006.

References

External links
Magazine website

1987 establishments in Virginia
Bimonthly magazines published in the United States
American Civil War magazines
Magazines established in 1987
Military magazines published in the United States
Magazines published in Virginia